Rune Gokstad (born 26 November 1958) is a Norwegian comedian, actor, and radio and television host.

Career
Born in Oslo, Gokstad was assigned with NRK from 1987. With Backe he also hosted the travel documentary Team Bachstad, and he has been responsible for quiz shows such as Julenøtter and Påskenøtter.

He was awarded the Leonard Statuette in 2010, and the Riksmål Society's television award in 2014.

Selected works

References

1958 births
Living people
Norwegian male comedians
Norwegian male actors
Norwegian television presenters
NRK people